The Conqueror's Story is a Hong Kong television series based on the events in the Chu–Han Contention, an interregnum between the fall of the Qin dynasty and the founding of the Han dynasty in Chinese history. It was first broadcast in 2004 in Hong Kong on TVB Jade.

Plot
The plot follows a story-by-story pattern, with each episode featuring an event before and during the Chu–Han Contention. A cast member explains the background of the story in the prologue of each episode.

Pre-episode extras 
Prior to the start of each episode is an extra scene that provides an explanation to a certain main point within that episode, many of which have been enshrined in history books, or have become idioms frequently used in modern Chinese society.

Cast
 Note: Some of the characters' names are in Cantonese romanisation.

 Adam Cheng as Lau Bong
 Kwong Wa as Hong Yu
 Maggie Cheung Ho-yee as Lui Chi
 Melissa Ng as Consort Yu
 Law Lok-lam as Fan Tsang
 Wong Chak-fung as Hung Chong
 Wong Chun-tong as Ying Bo
 Kong Hon as Hung Leung
 Chan Hung-lit as Hung Bak
 Yau Biu as Lung Chui
 Mak Ka-lun as Chung-lei Mui
 Siu Chuk-yiu as Yu Tze-kei
 Wayne Lai as Hon Sun
 Ram Chiang as Cheung Leung
 Ngai Wai as Fan Fai
 Gilbert Lam as Chan Ping
 Chan Wing-chun as Ha-hau Ying
 Henry Lo as Siu Ho
 Timothy Siu as Cho Sam
 Yu Tze-ming as Lik Yik-kei
 Cerina da Graca as Consort Chik
 Sherming Yiu as Lady Heung
 Angela Tong as Consort Bok
 Chan Kwan as Lau Ying
 Kwok Chuk-wah as Kei Shun
 Sun Kwai-hing as Lau Bong's father
 Liu Lai-lai as Lau Bong's mother
 Ngo Ka-nin as Chor Yi Dai
 Wong Ching as Sung Yi
 Lau Kong as Lui Man
 Mike Wong as Chun Chi Wong
 Law Kwan-chor as Chiu Ko
 Lee Wing-ho as Wu-hoi
 Lee Wing-hon as Tze-ying
 Cheung Tat-lun as Lui Bat-wai
 Ho Yin-chung as Fu-so
 Doi Chi-wai as Cheung Ping
 Choi Kok-hing as Cheung Hum
 Kwan Ching as Tung Yi
 Wah Chung-nam as Sze-ma Yan
 Chiu Man-tung as Chan Sing
 Tsui Wing as Ng Kwong
 Lee Hung-kit as Ngai Pau
 Wong Man-biu as Pang Yut
 Cheng Ka-sang as Cheung Yee
 Lee Hoi-sang as Chan Yu
 Tang Yu-chiu as Tin Do
 Cheung Hon-ban as Ng Jui
 Kwok Tak-shun as Hon Sun, King of Hon
 Joe Junior as Gak-lung
 Yiu Ying-ying as Yan Cheung
 Ngan Lai-jui as Princess Lo-yuen
 Cheng Chi-sing as Yung Chi

External links
  The Conqueror's Story official page on TVB's website

2004 Hong Kong television series debuts
2004 Hong Kong television series endings
TVB dramas
Television series set in the Western Han dynasty
Television series set in the Qin dynasty